Kaheh or Kahah may refer to:
 Kaheh, Hormozgan (كهه - Kaheh)
 Kaheh, Razavi Khorasan (كاهه - Kāheh)
 Kaheh, Sabzevar, Razavi Khorasan Province (كاهه - Kāheh)